The 1997 Indonesia Open in badminton was held in Surakarta, from July 16 to July 20, 1997. It was a five-star tournament and the prize money was US$200,000.

Final results

References
Smash: 1997 Indonesian Open

External links
 Tournament Link

Indonesia Open (badminton)
Indonesia
1997 in Indonesian sport
Surakarta